Sewayiah Creek is a stream in the U.S. state of Mississippi.

Sewayiah is a name derived from the Choctaw language purported to mean "deer bending down, deer stooping down". Variant names are "Chewah Creek" and "Line Creek".

References

Rivers of Mississippi
Rivers of Chickasaw County, Mississippi
Rivers of Clay County, Mississippi
Rivers of Webster County, Mississippi
Mississippi placenames of Native American origin